The U.S. Senior Open is one of the five major championships in  senior golf, introduced  in 1980. It is administered by the United States Golf Association (USGA) and is recognized as a major championship by both the PGA Tour Champions and the European Senior Tour. The lower age limit was 55 in 1980, but it was lowered to 50 for the second edition in 1981, which is the standard limit for men's senior professional golf tournaments. By definition, the event is open to amateurs, but has been dominated by professionals; through 2022, all editions have been won by pros. Like other USGA championships, it has been played on many courses throughout the United States.

Allen Doyle became the oldest U.S. Senior Open Champion in 2006, winning two weeks before his 58th birthday.

The total purse was the highest of any senior tour event until the Posco E&C Songdo Championship in South Korea, a Champions Tour event in 2010 and 2011 with a $3 million purse, but had a lower winner's share ($450,000). The U.S. Senior Open is again the highest purse on the PGA Tour Champions; in 2016 it was $3.75 million, and champion Gene Sauers earned $675,000. The purse in 2017 is anticipated to be $4 million, yielding a winner's share of $720,000.

Like other senior majors, players must walk the course unless they receive a medical exemption to use a cart. Winners gain entry into the following year's U.S. Open.

The playoff format was modified for 2018, reduced from three to two aggregate holes, followed by sudden death. The three-hole aggregate playoff was used in 2002 and 2014; the final 18-hole playoff at the U.S. Senior Open was in 1991, won by

Eligibility
The following players are exempt from qualifying for the U.S. Senior Open, provided they are 50 years old as of the opening day of the tournament. Amateur categories require that the player is still an amateur on the opening day of the tournament, except for the one-time exemption for former champions of the U.S. Amateur or The Amateur Championship.
Any past winner of the U.S. Senior Open
Winners of any of the major championships in the last 10 years
Winners of any of the U.S. Amateur in the last 10 years and runner-up in previous year
Winners of the Senior PGA Championship in the last 10 years
Winner of the Senior Open Championship in the last five years
Top 15 finishers from the previous year's U.S. Senior Open
Any amateur completing 72 holes in last U.S. Open 
Low amateur in last U.S. Senior Open
Winner and runner-up of the U.S. Senior Amateur in the previous year
Members of the Walker Cup and Eisenhower Trophy teams for the last two competitions
Members of both Ryder Cup and Presidents Cup teams for the last five competitions
Top 30 from the previous year's PGA Tour Champions money list, top 20 from current list
Top 50 leaders from the PGA Tour Champions career money list
Winners of PGA Tour Champions events in the previous three years
Top six from previous year's European Senior Tour money list
Top two from previous year's Japan Seniors Tour money list
Winners of PGA Tour events in the previous five years
Winners of the U.S. Open in first ten years of age eligibility
One-time exemption for any winner of a major championship, U.S. Amateur, or British Amateur.
Winners of amateur championships who have since turned professional are able to use this exemption.

Special exemptions are given occasionally, and like other USGA events, many qualify through the local and sectional ranks.

Winners

Multiple winners
Six men have multiple victories in the U.S. Senior Open:

3 wins
Miller Barber (1982, 1984, 1985)
2 wins 
Gary Player (1987, 1988)
Jack Nicklaus (1991, 1993)
Hale Irwin (1998, 2000)
Allen Doyle (2005, 2006)
Kenny Perry (2013, 2017)

Successful defenders of the title were Barber (1985), Player (1988), and Doyle (2006).

Winners of both U.S. Open and U.S. Senior Open
The following men have won both the U.S. Open and the U.S. Senior Open, the majors run by the USGA:

Palmer (1954) and Nicklaus (1959, 1961) also won the U.S. Amateur, previously considered a major.

Future sites

See also
U.S. Senior Women's Open
Golf in the United States

References

External links
U.S. Senior Open at USGA site (most of the information is in the archive section)
Coverage on the PGA Tour Champions's official site

PGA Tour Champions events
Senior Open
Recurring sporting events established in 1980
1980 establishments in New York (state)